Claudie is a given name. Notable people with the name include:

Claudie Blakley (born 1974), English actress
Claudie Haigneré (born 1957), French doctor, politician, and former astronaut
Claudie Minor, former tackle in the National Football League
"Claudie" a song by UK rock band Status Quo which appears on their 1973 album Hello!